The 1982 Tour de France was the 69th edition of Tour de France, one of cycling's Grand Tours. The Tour began in Basel, Switzerland with a prologue individual time trial on 2 July and Stage 10 occurred on 13 July with a flat stage to Bordeaux. The race finished on the Champs-Élysées in Paris on 25 July.

Prologue
2 July 1982 — Basel (Switzerland),  (individual time trial)

Stage 1
3 July 1982 — Basel (Switzerland) to Möhlin (Switzerland),

Stage 2
4 July 1982 — Basel (Switzerland) to Nancy,

Stage 3
5 July 1982 — Nancy to Longwy,

Stage 4
6 July 1982 — Beauraing (Belgium) to Mouscron (Belgium),

Stage 5
7 July 1982 — Orchies to Fontaine-au-Pire,  (team time trial)

This stage was annulled by a demonstration and replaced by stage 9a.

Stage 6
8 July 1982 — Lille,

Stage 7
10 July 1982 — Cancale to Concarneau,

Stage 8
11 July 1982 — Concarneau to Châteaulin,

Stage 9a
12 July 1982 — Lorient to Plumelec,  (team time trial)

Stage 9b
12 July 1982 — Plumelec to Nantes,

Stage 10
13 July 1982 — Saintes to Bordeaux,

References

1982 Tour de France
Tour de France stages